Mirkovo is a village in western Bulgaria, part of Sofia Province. It is the administrative centre of Mirkovo Municipality, which lies in the central eastern part of Sofia Province. The village is located in the eastern part of the Zlatitsa–Pirdop valley, 63 kilometres east of the capital Sofia, at the southern foot of the 1,787-metre Etropolska Baba Peak in the Etropole part of the Balkan Mountains.

The surrounding area has been inhabited since the Neolithic, with the Thracians and Romans populating it in Antiquity and the Slavs and Bulgars in the Middle Ages, when it was part of the First Bulgarian Empire and Second Bulgarian Empire. The village itself, however, was first mentioned in Ottoman registers in 1430 and 1751 as Mirkuva; the name is thought to originate from the South Slavic personal name Mirko with the placename suffix -ovo. A monastical school was established in 1825, during the Bulgarian National Revival, and the locals took an active part in the Liberation of Bulgaria, participating in hajduk bands and assisting the Russian forces as opalchentsi in the Russo-Turkish War of 1877-78. The village Bulgarian Orthodox church of Saint Greatmartyr Demetrius was built in 1834 by the masters Minko and Delo.

Gallery

External links
 Mirkovo municipality page at Sofia Province website 

Villages in Sofia Province